The West Second Street Historic District is the oldest historic district in the city of Mesa, Arizona. It was added to the National Register of Historic Places in 1999 and features a greater variety of architectural styles than other historic districts in the city. Styles represented include Colonial Revival, Spanish Colonial Revival, Tudor Revival, Mission Revival, and Pueblo Revival. The district includes many homes of Mesa's most prominent families from its early history.

The original boundaries of the district were roughly between Robson St. and Center St., from 1st St. to 3rd St. In 2003, the district was expanded to include the entire area roughly bounded by Robson St., University Dr. and MacDonald St.

An annual historic home tour, sponsored by the Mesa Historical Museum, allows the public to visit several homes in the district.

See also

 List of National Historic Landmarks in Arizona
 National Register of Historic Places listings in Arizona
 National Register of Historic Places listings in Maricopa County, Arizona

References

Houses in Maricopa County, Arizona
Geography of Maricopa County, Arizona
Buildings and structures in Mesa, Arizona